Frederick Andrew Amoore (6 June 1913 – 11 June 1996) was Bishop of Bloemfontein from 1967 to 1982.

He was educated at the University of Leeds, and ordained in 1937. He began his career  with curacies in Clapham, England and  Port Elizabeth, South Africa. After this he was Rector of St Saviour's, East London. From 1950 to 1962 he was Dean of St Albans Cathedral, Pretoria when he ascended to the episcopate.

References

1913 births
Alumni of the University of Leeds
Deans of Pretoria
20th-century Anglican Church of Southern Africa bishops
Anglican bishops of Bloemfontein
1996 deaths